Rock Werchter 2007 was a festival that ran from Thursday, 28 June 2007 until Sunday, 1 July 2007 at the Rock Werchter site in the Belgian village of Werchter.

Complete line-up 
Thursday (28 June)

Mika was scheduled to perform at the Pyramid Marquee on this day.  However, he was replaced by Milow, a local singer.

Friday (29 June)

Saturday (30 June)

Sunday (1 July)

References 
 Official website

Rock Werchter
2007 music festivals